Ancilla inornata is a species of sea snail, a marine gastropod mollusk in the family Ancillariidae.

Description

Distribution
This marine species occurs off Oman.

References

inornata
Gastropods described in 1879